Johan Andreé Mina Mendoza (born 15 May 2002) is an Ecuadorian footballer currently playing as a midfielder for Emelec, on loan from Werder Bremen.

Club career
Born in Guayaquil, Ecuador, Mina started his career with Emelec at the age of eleven. However, a contract dispute meant that he did not play football at all between 2018 and 2020. He was linked with Spanish and English giants Barcelona and Chelsea, but eventually he moved to Germany to sign for Werder Bremen. In October 2019, while still at Emelec, he was named by English newspaper The Guardian as one of the best players born in 2003 worldwide.

Mina was unable to settle at Werder Bremen, where he struggled to make friends or enjoy German cuisine. He was loaned to Portuguese side Estoril Praia in 2021, but again failed to settle, as Estoril deployed him at left-back for their under-23 side, a far cry from his natural false-nine position. Despite winning the under-23 league, Mina only totalled ten appearances in the whole season.

In July 2022, Mina returned to childhood club Emelec on a one-year loan from Werder Bremen. However, he again struggled for game time, and it was rumoured that the loan would be cut short in November 2022.

International career
Mina has represented Ecuador at under-17 and under-23 level.

Personal life
Johan's father, Joaquin, also represented Emelec in the 1990s.

Career statistics

Club

Notes

References

2002 births
Living people
Sportspeople from Guayaquil
Ecuadorian footballers
Ecuador youth international footballers
Association football midfielders
C.S. Emelec footballers
SV Werder Bremen players
G.D. Estoril Praia players
Ecuadorian expatriate footballers
Ecuadorian expatriate sportspeople in Germany
Expatriate footballers in Germany
Ecuadorian expatriate sportspeople in Portugal
Expatriate footballers in Portugal